Khayarmara नेपाली: खयरमारा is a part of Janakpur Zone Mahottari district in Nepal. It is within the VDC. It touches many areas together with Sindhuli to North and Sarlahi to west.

Khayarmara is located in Mahottari District Janakpur Jone. It is  upward from Mahendra Highway. Its entry gate name is Banpat Chowk near to Laxminiya Chowk. There is one bazaar located in center of village. Its near district is Sarlahi and Sindhuli. We can go Sarlahi by crossing Banke Khola and we can travel Sindhuli from Bhitri Khola. Wad 1 lies top of the village. Many people go to Lalbandi, Bardibas and other places for shopping. There is electricity, water, and communication.

Place Name of Khayarmara (VDC)
Banpat Chowk
School Chowk
Bajar Area
Bhitrikhola
Chodke
16 Number
Damarbhangyang, Khayarmara
7 Number
krishna chowk [under 7 Number]
Tilbari
Chodke 
Pathiparan
Bhetneri
Bayelbas
Dobhan
Pokhari Tole

Education
In the education sector there are more than 7 government School. We can get education up to 12th grade.

Government School
Shree Laxmi Narayan Janta Higher Secondary School.
Sahid Bishal Kumar MALGADIS.
Bhetnery School.
Chodke School.
Bhangre School.
Damarbhangyang School.
Shree janta prathamic school.

List of Private School
Bright Star English School.
Bright Future English School.
Mount Sita Buddha English School.
Hamro Pathsala (under construction)

Transportation
There is a gravel road (Under construction). From Khayarmara to Sindhuli. We can get many facility of transport. We can get Auto, Car, Jeep, Bus, Moterbike in every one hours.

List of Bus Time Table
 6:00AM  Bardibas Sindhuli Kathmandu 
 8:00AM Bardibas Sindhuli
 9:00AM Chapur Hetauda

References

External links
 Official Website
Official Twitter
 Official Facebook
 

Populated places in Mahottari District